Integrity management consulting is an emerging sector of consultancy that advises individuals and corporations on how to apply the highest ethical standards to every aspect of their business. Integrity within a corporate set up is a holistic approach that makes prudent and ethical decisions not only relating to finance but other areas as well, which include operations, marketing, human resources as well as manufacturing by adhering to the highest standards of product quality, open and clear communication and transparency in all operations as well as relationships. At the core of integrity management is the belief that companies have a strong interest, as well as a responsibility, to act with integrity at all times. This field arose in response to:

(a) The increased perception that companies are more likely to succeed when they act with integrity.

(b) Increased awareness by company directors of the need to seek expert advice to help them align and incorporate high ethical standards with business strategy and integrate them across all operational functions.

In recent years, the general public have become both better informed and more concerned about business ethics at home and in developing countries. As a result, governments have been called on to legislate, and business leaders to innovate, to ensure that high ethical standards are put at the heart of business and industry. There have been numerous regulations and ethical compliance measures to monitor financial performance of the organization. To complement these regulations and to present a fully dimensional ethical view of the organization from within, companies adopt different models such as Six Sigma, the Balanced Scorecard and the Triple Bottom Line.

The field of integrity management consulting aims to address:

 The demand for companies to respond to increasing awareness of ethical misconduct and resulting expectations for transparency and accountability.
 The requirement for companies to comply with a stricter legal framework and avoid prosecution for unethical behavior and,
 The desire for executives to make their enterprises leaders in responsible and sustainable development.

Increased public awareness and expectations
Media attention given to ethical lapses means that companies are increasingly being held responsible for unethical behavior including corruption, labour issues and the poor working conditions in their own operations, in those of their subsidiaries, as well as for the actions of subcontractors acting on their behalf. An early example of the demand for responsibility starting to take hold was in the early 1990s when the reputation of a major footwear corporation was severely damaged, the brand devalued, and the company subjected to consumer boycotts after the discovery of the supplier's poor labor standards. Child labour watchdogs found children as young as 10 working for Nike making shoes, clothing and footballs in Pakistan and Cambodia.

Appalling workplace conditions have existed for centuries. However, the media has now made ethical transgressions readily public. In fact, according to a briefing by the Institute of Business Ethics, in 2009 there were 25 media stories on corporate ethical lapses in the extractive industries alone. Reported issues for this sector included environmental matters and allegations of human rights abuses in emerging markets, as well as accusations that oil companies were dumping toxic material in West Africa. The briefing also highlighted the amount of negative media attention given to the wider retail sector in 2009. Numerous stories exposed unethical practices, such as exploiting sweatshop labour, and accused some retailers of posing a danger to indigenous communities in Africa.

The impact of such negative exposure can include:
 Damaged corporate reputations and brand devaluation,
 lower employee moral,
 consumer boycotts,
 loss of market share,
 negative perceptions on behalf of investors,
 legal action and
 fines and in some jurisdictions jail terms for directors.

According to Transparency International (TI), which investigates business corruption across the globe and corruption were partly to blame for the recent global economic crisis of 2007–2008. The conditions cited included: serious lapses in corporate due diligence, governance and integrity;  poor transparency and accountability and inadequate corporate integrity systems. The worldwide recession has furthered the public's demand for businesses to behave responsibly.

More stringent legal requirements
Stricter legal frameworks have made it easier to prosecute transgressors and new international initiatives are helping countries to work in collaboration to deter poor business ethics.

The OECD Anti-Bribery Convention (officially OECD Convention on Combating Bribery of Foreign Public Officials in International Business Transactions) is a convention of the OECD, ratified by 41 countries and aimed at reducing corruption in developing countries by encouraging sanctions against bribery in international business transactions carried out by companies based in member countries. Countries that have signed the Convention are required to put in place legislation that criminalizes the act of bribing a foreign public official. Much of the legislation passed by member countries have international reach.

One such example is the Bribery Act 2010 which was enacted into law on 8 April and defines three discrete criminal offences: offering or paying a bribe; requesting or receiving a bribe; bribing a foreign public official.  (A specific offence required to comply with the OECD Convention mentioned above); and a new corporate offence of failing to prevent bribery being undertaken on its behalf. The Act applies to British companies, partnerships, citizens, and individuals ordinarily resident in the UK, regardless of where the relevant act occurs. They also apply to non-British nationals, companies, and partnerships if an act or omission forming part of the offence takes place within the UK.

The Foreign Corrupt Practices Act of 1977(FCPA)(15 U.S.C. §§ 78dd-1, et seq.) is a United States federal law with international reach which also targets unethical behavior. The Act is known primarily for two of its main provisions: one that addresses accounting transparency requirements under the Securities Exchange Act of 1934(SEC); and, another concerning bribery of foreign officials. The FCPA applies to individuals and businesses with securities registered in the United States or a principal place of business in the United States. While this Act has been in existence for quite some time, the SEC and the DOJ have recently increased their enforcement efforts.

A well-known example of a company prosecuted under the FCPA is German car maker, Daimler, which agreed to pay US$185 million in fines to the US government over alleged bribes paid to secure contracts abroad. BAE Systems PLC, a UK-based defense contractor also agreed to pay a US$400 million fine in FCPA related enforcement action. There are numerous other examples. In existence for around 40 years now, the FCPA is a very powerful tool in the hands of US DOJ and SEC which they use as a weapon of recovery of billions of dollars from foreign corporations worldwide over which US authorities have little jurisdiction.

Most recently, the Dodd-Frank Wall Street Reform and Consumer Protection Act (also known as the Financial Reform Act) signed into U.S. law by President Barack Obama on July 21, 2010 contains a clause that specifically requires companies with products containing cassiterite (tin ore), columbite-tantalite (coltan), wolframite, and gold to disclose to the Securities and Exchange Commission (SEC) whether the minerals are sourced from the Democratic Republic of Congo or adjoining countries. Companies will have to detail the measures they have taken to avoid sourcing the minerals from Congolese armed groups, which are guilty of massacres and other atrocities. The bill also requires that all information disclosed be independently audited.

This legislation underpins some of the reasons businesses are taking integrity seriously and enlisting integrity management consultancies. Many businesses leaders have realized that early adopters of strong corporate ethics will thrive, as did those quick to embrace the environmental agenda in recent years. Consumers and shareholders are increasingly ready to recognize the value of corporate responsibility in international business. Increasingly, responsibility and sustainable value are intertwined.

Role of consultancies
In response, the field of integrity management has been born to help clients conduct business, even in the most challenging of markets, without compromising their ethics. With the help of expert advice, companies can go beyond abiding by the law to taking a voluntary, proactive approach to ensuring a company's activities promote behaving responsibly, with fairness, sustainability, and cultural sensitivity in the communities in which they operate. It is very different in this respect from the more reactive field of risk management, although some risk management companies have attempted to embrace ethical risk as an area of specialism. Many risk management consultancies are adjuncts to private security companies. Therefore, some would-be clients are not convinced that they are best-placed to assist in the area of integrity and ethical management, because their parent companies face reputational challenges themselves.

Specialist integrity management consultancy helps business leaders not only to avoid business practices that represent risk to an industry or economy, but also helps to bring such practices under scrutiny so that they can be brought to a quick end.

The practice of integrity management consultancy combines numerous disciplines including established Knowledge Acquisition Methodologies, Public Relations Practices, Business Risk Management techniques, Corporate Social Responsibility (CSR), Compliance functions, Insider Threat detection and Financial expertise to help clients make responsible and ethical business decisions.

Integrity management consultancies offer services such as:

 Identifying potential reputational and ethical threats for clients
 Developing practical recommendations to mitigate these threats
 Making recommendations for, and carrying out due diligence on local professional service suppliers
 Providing advice on accessing a local pool of talent and addressing cultural considerations for building an effective local workforce
 Conducting detailed investigations into proposed local partners and key employees
 Preparing community needs reviews for better targeting of CSR programmes and;
 Administering anti and counter-corruption training

Many also offer general ethics audits so that companies can obtain independent verification to attest to the high standard of their corporate ethics. Of course, this is not an exhaustive list as each consultancy offers different services.

References

External links
 EthiSphere Institute (see also Ethisphere Institute)

Business ethics
Anti-corruption measures